Bayern Munich went into the 2006–07 season with head coach Felix Magath. On 1 February 2007, Magath was sacked after disappointing domestic results including a third round exit from the cup. His predecessor, Ottmar Hitzfeld, was appointed to be his successor, too.

Results

Bundesliga
Bayern hosted Borussia Dortmund in the opener of the 44th Bundesliga season on 11 August 2006. On the last day of play, on 19 May 2007, they won against Mainz 05, finishing in the fourth place, a position they held almost all through the second half of the season. The fourth-place finish qualified Bayern for the 2007–08 UEFA Cup.

DFB-Pokal

Champions League
Bayern was qualified for the 2006–07 UEFA Champions League. Their opponents in Group B were Spartak Moscow, Sporting CP and Internazionale.

Bayern was eliminated in the quarter-finals by Milan.

Group stage

First knockout stage

Quarter-finals

Statistics

Appearances

|}

Goals

Bookings

References

FC Bayern Munich seasons
Bayern Munich